The 1996 Southern Conference men's basketball tournament took place from February 29–March 3, 1996, at the Greensboro Coliseum in Greensboro, North Carolina. The Western Carolina Catamounts, led by head coach Phil Hopkins, won their first Southern Conference title and received the automatic berth to the 1996 NCAA tournament.

Format
The top nine finishers of the conference's ten members were eligible for the tournament. Teams were seeded based on conference winning percentage. The tournament used a preset bracket consisting of four rounds, the first of which featured one game, with the winners moving on to the quarterfinal round.

Bracket

* Overtime game

See also
List of Southern Conference men's basketball champions

References

Tournament
Southern Conference men's basketball tournament
Southern Conference men's basketball tournament
Southern Conference men's basketball tournament
Southern Conference men's basketball tournament
Basketball competitions in Greensboro, North Carolina
College sports tournaments in North Carolina